Cottonwood is a census-designated place (CDP) in Apache County, Arizona, United States. The population was 226 at the 2010 census.

Geography

Demographics

References

Census-designated places in Apache County, Arizona
Populated places on the Navajo Nation